Mabel Ida Albertson (July 24, 1901 – September 28, 1982) was an American actress of television, stage, radio and film who portrayed Phyllis Stephens in the TV sitcom Bewitched.

Early years
Mabel Ida Albertson was born on July 24, 1901, in Haverhill, Massachusetts, to Flora (Craft) and Leopold Albertson, who were Russian-born Jewish immigrants. Her younger brother was actor Jack Albertson, who played Grandpa Joe in Willy Wonka & the Chocolate Factory. Their mother, a stock actress, supported the family by working in a shoe factory.

Albertson graduated from the New England School of Speech and Expression.

Albertson traced her show business career back to age 13, when she was paid $5 per performance to play piano behind palm trees for a reader. She later moved to California and became involved with the Pasadena Playhouse.

She "moved directly into professional stage work in stock, vaudeville, and night clubs, appearing with Jimmy Durante."

Television
Albertson portrayed Phyllis Stephens, Darrin's neurotic, interfering mother, on the television sitcom Bewitched, who invariably ended her stays at the Stephens' home by saying to her husband, "Frank, take me home. I have a sick headache." She also played the mother of Jack Benny (seven years her senior) on several episodes of his television series.
During 1972–1973, she played Mabel, the mother-in-law of Paul Lynde on The Paul Lynde Show.
She appeared in at least one episode of the courtroom drama series Perry Mason: as Carrie Wilson in the Season 6, 1962 episode titled "The Case of the Hateful Hero". Albertson also guest-starred as the mother of Marilyn Munster's would-be suitor in the first broadcast episode of The Munsters, "Munster Masquerade".
Dragnet 1967 "The Bullet" Albertson played Jessie Gaynor, and she played the mother of Barbara and Margaret Whiting in Those Whiting Girls. She also played the dean of a women's college in an episode of The Tab Hunter Show, Susannah's mother in Accidental Family, Alice's mother in Bob & Carol & Ted & Alice, Donald Hollinger's mother on That Girl, Irene Brady in The Tom Ewell Show, Howard Sprague's mother on The Andy Griffith Show, Miss Ramsey on Hazel,  Mrs. White on The Lucy Show episode "Lucy and the Missing Stamp", Eileen Ruby, Harry Ruby's wife, in Make Room For Daddy episode "Danny Goes On USO Tour", Dick Van Dyke's mother on The New Dick Van Dyke Show, and Ethel Kendricks on the Mary Tyler Moore Show episode "Anyone Who Hates Kids and Dogs", Gertrude Mills on The George Burns and Gracie Allen Show. Rawhide Season 2 Episode 24 as Kalla, Gypsy Queen. In the 1957 episode of Gunsmoke, "Cows and Cribs", she played Ma Smalley, a kindly boarding house owner. In the 1963 episode of Gunsmoke, "Kate Heller", she played the title character, as well as “Gody Baines” in a 1961 episode (Long, Long Trail). In 1966 she played Madam Adella in the Bonanza episode "A Dollar's Worth of Trouble". In Season 1 (1952/53) of Adventures of Superman, she played Kate White, Perry White's sister in the episode "Drums of Death" originally aired January 16, 1953.

Radio
Albertson was heard on Dress Rehearsal, Joe Rines' Dress Rehearsal, and the Phil Baker Show. She was also a writer for radio programs.

Film
A memorable early film role for Albertson was as a proper banker's wife who is repulsed by the bucolic title characters in Ma and Pa Kettle at Waikiki (1955). She was also seen in She's Back on Broadway, So This Is Love, About Mrs. Leslie, Forever, Darling, The Long, Hot Summer, Don't Give Up the Ship, On a Clear Day You Can See Forever and as Mrs. Van Hoskins, a wealthy woman whose jewels are stolen, in the screwball comedy film What's Up, Doc? (1972).

Stage
Albertson's Broadway credits include The Egg (1962) and Xmas in Las Vegas (1965).

Death
According to her former daughter-in-law, Cloris Leachman, Mabel Albertson died on September 28, 1982, of Alzheimer's disease at St. John's Hospital, after suffering seven years of poor health in Santa Monica, California at age 81. Her ashes were scattered into the Pacific Ocean.

Filmography

References

External links

 
 
 
Mabel Albertson scrapbook, 1933-1939, held by the Billy Rose Theatre Division, New York Public Library for the Performing Arts

1901 births
1982 deaths
American film actresses
American stage actresses
American radio actresses
American television actresses
Jewish American actresses
Actresses from Massachusetts
American people of Russian-Jewish descent
Deaths from Alzheimer's disease
Deaths from dementia in California
20th-century American actresses
People from Haverhill, Massachusetts
20th-century American Jews